David Georgievich Sanakoev (also spelled Sanakoyev) is a South Ossetian political and public figure. He has served as chairman of two different South Ossetian political parties and as President Leonid Tibilov's Minister of Foreign Affairs.

Early life
Sanakoev attended the Tskhinvali secondary school Number 5 from 1982 to 1993. He then attended the South Ossetian State University earning a degree in Finance and Credit in 1998. In 2008 he enrolled in the Russian Presidential Academy of National Economy and Public Administration and wrote a dissertation titled "The activities of public authorities to resolve refugee issues on the materials of North Ossetia-Alania."

Sanakoev is also the president of the Kyokushin-kan Karate-do Federation in South Ossetia.

Professional career

Sanakoev worked as a consultant to the "Children's Fund of the Republic of South Ossetia" from 1998 to 2000. From 2000 to 2001 he worked for an organization named "Era" as a consultant on refugee issues. From 2001 to 2002 he worked as an advisor to the "Agency for the Motivation of Society and Social Development." From 2002 to 2004 he worked as an assistant for the "Agency for Socio-Economic and Cultural Development." 

In 2004 he began working for the Armed Forces of South Ossetia as the Deputy commander for the "Separate Mountain Company" which was under the jurisdiction of the Armed Forces' "Ministry of Defense and Emergency Situations." His commander was Bestauta Bala Ivanovich. Simultaneously, starting in 2004 he began working as the Presidential Representative for Human Rights for president Eduard Kokoity. During his time in this capacity he oversaw what the South Ossetian government called the "evacuation of children" from Tskhinvali. Sanakoev was responsible for the illegal kidnapping and imprisonment of 110 Georgian civilians, mostly children and the elderly. of which at least 27 died due to neglect and poor conditions.

Following the conclusion of the war, Sanakoev released the surviving prisoners under his care, only 45 survived the conditions he subjected them to. He has also worked for "Ossetia Accuses" and the Organization of Ossetian Communities "Sandizan" since 2008, both of which accuse Georgia of committing war crimes. He has also worked for the United Nations as a South Ossetian representative to the discussions on a non-violent resolution to the frozen conflict, as well as for discussions on refugees and missing persons.

Political Career

2012 election

Sanakoev ran as a candidate in the 2012 South Ossetian presidential election. He campaigned on a platform of government reform, wishing to sever ties between the government and big businesses, creating directly elected District heads, and make ministerial positions be held accountable by Parliament  He would advance to the second round after narrowly beating the Moscow backed Dmitry Medoyev with 6,627 votes to Medoyev's 6,415, making the election be the first time there wasn't a Russian endorsed candidate. He would go on to get 12,439 votes, or 43.64% of the electorate, well short of Tibilov's 15,786 votes or 55.38% of the electorate. Despite this, Tibilov would name Sanakoev his foreign minister on  May 30, 2012

2014 election

Hoping to keep his political platform of reformism alive, Sanakoev founded the New Ossetia political party immediately after his defeat in 2012 to participate in the 2014 South Ossetian parliamentary election. Sanakoev immediately tempered expectations for the party during its foundation, and the party went on to win 6.27% of the vote, but zero seats in parliament. As minister of foreign affairs he leaked a drafted treaty between Russia and South Ossetia which would've caused the annexation of the republic into Russia to the Georgian media. The treaty was already redrafted at this point, without the annexation clause. Sanakoev would fail a no confidence on March 13, 2015 for officially for failing to attend two parliamentary sessions and was removed from office on April 22, 2015. Unofficially the vote was retaliation for leaking of the draft treaty to Georgian media. After this incident the Sanakoev was labeled as "nationalist" and "pro-Georgian" by Valery Kaziyev, then head of the Communist Party of South Ossetia. In response to these accusations Sanakoev sued Kaziyev for libel.

2019 election

In the 2017 election, pro-Russian Anatoly Bibilov was elected president and introduced new bureaucratic hurdles for his opposition parties, namely needing to register a party before every election, with his office determining which parties can and cannot be re-registered. New Ossetia found itself in the latter category. Seeing as the two parties platforms where similar, Sanakoev merged New Ossetia into Nykhaz and was elected its chairman in June of 2018. Shortly after in 2019 he was joined by the Alanian Union led by Alan Gagloev. As chairman, Sanakoev oversaw the party's efforts in the 2019 South Ossetian parliamentary election. During which the party doubled their popular vote, but failed to gain any new seats in Parliament, although, he himself would win a seat. He would lose a party leadership election in February 2020 to Gagloev, who would be the parties canidate for president in the 2022 South Ossetian presidential election, and would go on to win.

ICC indictment 
On 24 June 2022, Sanakoev was indicted by the International Criminal Court due to his aforementioned detention of 110 ethnically Georgian civilians, mostly consisting of elderly women and children. Combined with the fact the poor conditions he placed them under resulted in the proven deaths of at least 27 of them, the ICC found that he violated article 49 of the Fourth Geneva Convention.

Awards and medals
 South Ossetia: In Commemoration of the 15th Anniversary of the Republic of South Ossetia - 2006
 South Ossetia: Participant of the peacekeeping operation in Pridnestrovie - 2007
 South Ossetia: For Service in Guard of Peace - 2008, 2010
 South Ossetia: Bulavin uprising 300th year anniversary jubilee cross - 2008
 South Ossetia: Regimental badge of General Baklanov - 2009
 South Ossetia: Silver Cross of the Orenburg Cossack Society - 2010
 South Ossetia: For Faith and Fatherland -2010
 South Ossetia: Golden Badge of Honor in Public Recognition - 2011

References 

1976 births
21st-century politicians
Government ministers of South Ossetia
Living people
People indicted by the International Criminal Court
People indicted for war crimes
People of the Russo-Georgian War